Made of Steel is a BBC Books original novella written by Terrance Dicks and based on the long-running British science fiction television series Doctor Who. It features the Tenth Doctor and Martha. This paperback is part of the Quick Reads Initiative sponsored by the UK government, to encourage literacy. It has a similar look to BBC Books' other new series adventures, except for its much shorter word count, being a paperback and not being numbered as part of the same series. To date it is the one of only five novels based upon the revived series that have not been published in hardcover: the first, I am a Dalek, was published in May 2006; the third, Revenge of the Judoon, was published in March 2008; the fourth, The Sontaran Games, was published in February 2009; and the fifth, Code of the Krillitanes, was published in March 2010. These four books are also part of the Quick Reads Initiative.

Plot
Returning from the Cretaceous period, The Tenth Doctor and Martha Jones journey to the present day, where Cybermen have been teleporting into labs and stealing technology.

The Doctor takes Martha back to the Royal Hope hospital, where they have a confrontation with a pair of Cybermen in the car park. After nearly being captured, the Cybermen suddenly disappear, due to faults with their unfamiliar teleportation technology. The Army also want to get their hands on the Doctor, and ask for his help, so the Army capture him and his TARDIS from the Royal Hope Hospital, and he is separated from Martha.

At the Army Base, the Doctor realises that the Cybermen who were made on Earth, not the parallel universe (and were therefore not sucked into the void) having been using teleportion devices stolen from the Torchwood building, to help them gather enough technology to create a portal capable of reopening                                      The Void and release the Cybermen trapped inside. But the Cybermen do not know how to open the Void, and so they need the Doctor to open it for them. That's why they're trying to capture him alive.

While Martha is separated from the Doctor, the Cybermen reappear, and capture her. They take her to their secret base where they discuss whether or not to kill her. Soon, the Doctor phones her on her mobile, and lets slip where he is. Just as Martha is about to tell him where she is, the Cyberleader snatches her phone and destroys it, then plans an attack on the Army Base where the Doctor is being held.

The Doctor manages to figure out that the Cybermen are at the Millennium Dome. But a team of 6 Cybermen (who were being kept frozen since the battle of Canary Wharf) attacks the base. The Army manages to destroy all but the Cyberleader with special weapons they had prepared in case Cybermen should invade again. The Cyberleader tells the Doctor that they'll kill Martha unless he helps them, then vanishes.

The Doctor and the Army plan to attack the Millennium Dome. Having retrieved his TARDIS from the base, the Doctor manages to materialize right inside the Dome but the Army cannot enter due to a force-field set up by the Cybermen. The Doctor cooperates with the remaining two Cybermen & the Cyberleader, and opens their portal by linking up their equipment to the TARDIS. But the Cybermen realize that the Doctor's methods do not work, and the force-field does not lead to the Void. Instead, it leads to Prehistoric Earth. A Tyrannosaurus rex appears and kills two Cybermen. Martha damages the force-field generator, and the Doctor uses an electrical cord from it to fry the Cyberleader. The portal then closes. With the Army entering too late, the Doctor and Martha say good-bye, then leave in the TARDIS to go somewhere 'peaceful'.

Publication
This is the first New Series Adventure to be written by Terrance Dicks, who has written books for all previous lines of Doctor Who fiction with the exception of the Telos Doctor Who novellas. Dicks served as script editor for the original Doctor Who series in the early 1970s and contributed many teleplays, and was prolific in novelizing serials for Target Books, serving also as editor for the line. Dicks' involvement in Made of Steel marks the first time that a writer connected with the original 1963-89 series has been directly involved in a story related to the 2005–present series.

See also

Whoniverse

External links
The Cloister Library - Made of Steel

2007 British novels
2007 science fiction novels
Doctor Who novellas
British science fiction novels
Tenth Doctor novels
Novels by Terrance Dicks
Cybermen novels
BBC Books books